Wilsie is an unincorporated community in Braxton County, West Virginia, United States. Wilsie had a post office, which closed on July 23, 2005.

References

Unincorporated communities in Braxton County, West Virginia
Unincorporated communities in West Virginia